Sir Charles Frederick Farran (29 January 1840 – 9 September 1898) was an Irish judge who was Chief Justice of the Bombay High Court.

Career
Farran was the third son of George and Elizabeth Farran of Belcamp House, County Dublin. He was educated at Trinity College, Dublin. He came to British India and worked as the Advocate General and Puisne Judge of Bombay Presidency. Frederick Farran was the first editor of the Indian Law Reports, Bombay Series, which commenced in 1875. In 1895, he was appointed the Chief Justice of the Bombay High Court after Sir Charles Sargent and served there till 1898. He became knighted on 27 January 1896.

While in service, Farran died in Bombay.

References

1840 births
1898 deaths
People from Fingal
British India judges
Knights Bachelor
Chief Justices of the Bombay High Court
Judges of the Bombay High Court
Expatriate judges from Ireland